Jean Pierre Vial (born 17 February 1951) is a member of the Senate of France, representing the Savoie department.  He is a member of the Union for a Popular Movement.

References
Page on the Senate website

1951 births
Living people
Union for a Popular Movement politicians
French Senators of the Fifth Republic
French people of Basque descent
Politicians from Chambéry
Senators of Savoie